Ornativalva kalahariensis is a moth of the family Gelechiidae. It was described by Anthonie Johannes Theodorus Janse in 1960. It is found in Namibia and South Africa.

Adults have been recorded on wing in January, April and November.

The larvae feed on Tamarix usneoides.

References

Moths described in 1960
Ornativalva